is a Japanese manga written and illustrated by Ryō Azuchi. Beginning serialization in Mag Garden's Comic Blade in 2008, Softenni consists of eight volumes. An anime adaptation by Xebec aired on April 7, 2011 on Tokyo MX and finished on June 24, 2011.

Plot
The series follows Shiratama Middle School student Asuna Harukaze and her teammates, who are all members of their school's Soft Tennis club. Their team are intent on winning the soft tennis national championship but must also deal with the trials, twists and turns of their comedic, adventurous school life.

Characters

The main protagonist of the series. She's quite enthusiastic about tennis to the point she will sometimes swing around objects (including a pitchfork much to her mother's chagrin). She has a bad habit of misunderstanding certain comments made by others normally taking them as sexual innuendos. Asuna has terrible luck with the tennis court's white lines and continually trips over them as a gag. She joined the team in order to achieve the perfect woman's body and occasionally pictures herself as a much older, lewder woman.

A headstrong girl that appears to be the most ambitious one of the group. She dreams big when it comes to the sport of tennis.  Kotone has a crush on Mishimagi and tends to compete with Elizabeth when it comes to his affections. Her biggest dream is to play soft tennis at Wimbledon, unfortunately she does not know soft tennis doesn't exist in the Wimbledon tournaments.

A very busty girl with a penchant for gluttony and current captain of the club. She has been hungry enough to attempt eating an endangered species (ie, The Japanese Giant Salamander). She even fantasizes about things that can be eaten as food. In spite of being team captain, Chitose is a poor tennis player. This weakness is overcome whenever she envisions the ball as something edible. She is rather smart and calculating (though her calculations are usually slightly off) and occasionally comes up with unorthodox methods of playing the game (playing with a net-sized racket for instance). However, she is very passionate about Soft Tennis (almost to the point of being frightening) and loves to see her teammates compete.

An English transfer student. She met Mishimagi a few years before her transfer to Asuna's school and developed a crush on him. She doesn't hold a great Japanese vocabulary so she may sometimes say certain words in English. Elizabeth seems to get along with Kurusu.

A stoic and rather emotionless girl who speaks in monotone and has a habit of wearing animal costumes. Despite her cosplay fetish Kurusu is one of the best players on the team.

The newest member of the team. Yayoi is a shy girl with a strong spiritual sense. When playing she can be possessed by the spirit of her dead sister Uzuki, a self proclaimed soft tennis genius. Uzuki's personality is the complete opposite of Yayoi's possessing arrogance, aggressiveness and sadistic inclinations. While Uzuki is an excellent tennis player she can only retain control of Yayoi for short periods of time.

Nicknamed  by the girls, Hiroshi is the coach of the Shiratama Soft Tennis team and a former national champion. While he may be rather lazy and a bit of a drunkard (as depicted when he drank a lot with the vice principal), he deeply cares for each of the girls as any teacher would and wish nothing more than to see them succeed.  He also seems to have a fear of spirits as seen when he would go to a church or Shinto shrine after he sees Yayoi speaking with spirits.

The manager of Akadama Middle School Soft Tennis Club. Leo has an obsession of providing massage services to his team members although his massages causes sexual arousal for the girls. He has a little fetish for cross-dressing, usually going by the name Leona Tenchi while in drag, and seems to have a crush on Asuna.

The captain of Akadama Middle School Soft Tennis Club. She is exactly the same as Kotone in terms of personality. As a result the pair have developed a friendly rivalry.

The current national champion. Despite her cool appearance Misaki has a child like love of cats, especially Nyan taro. Her training methods are extreme and very brutal which the other girls soon discovered. Despite her skills and title, Misaki seems slightly self-conscious about her body, exclaiming "There's something to grab!" when Asuna accidentally grabs her chest and notes that there isn't much there. She sometimes ends up in compromising positions which her assistant Yura always manages to capture on tape.

She was assigned to spy on Shiratama Middle School Soft Tennis team by Misaki Shidou. Instead of getting their information, she 'enjoyed' her stay with them and indulged her obsession of taking 'sadistic' photos for her own masochist satisfaction. She seems to be somewhat obsessed with taking lewd photos and videos of her captain.

The former captain of the Soft Tennis Club who is currently in High school. She is also Mishimagi's cousin.

Media
The original manga by Ryō Azuchi began serialization in Mag Garden's Monthly Comic Blade magazine from 2008. The series will be added to legal manga reading site JManga on June 5, 2012.

Anime
An anime television series was announced in December 2010 in Comic Blade and confirmed to begin the following spring, with 12 episodes. It aired on Tokyo MX on April 7, 2011 and finished on June 24, 2011. It is produced by Xebec, with character designs by Yūichi Oka, Yoshikazu Iwanami as sound director, and Ryouki Kamitsubo as director. The anime has been licensed in North America by Sentai Filmworks for digital and home video distribution.

Notes

References

External links
  
 

Anime series based on manga
Anime and manga set in Hokkaido
Comedy anime and manga
Mag Garden manga
Sentai Filmworks
Shōnen manga
Tennis in anime and manga
Tokyo MX original programming
Xebec (studio)